School District 23 Central Okanagan is a school district in the Okanagan valley of British Columbia. It includes the cities of Kelowna, and West Kelowna, and the District Municipalities of Lake Country, and Peachland, and is the 5th largest district in BC. The boundaries of the school district are identical to those of the Regional District of Central Okanagan.

Schools

Human Rights Complaint 
Central Okanagan School District No 23 v Renaud, [1992] 2 S.C.R. 970 is a leading Supreme Court of Canada decision where the Court found that an employer was under a duty to accommodate the religious beliefs of employees to the point of undue hardship.

References

See also 
 Central Okanagan School District No. 23 v. Renaud
 List of school districts in British Columbia

Education in Kelowna
Lake Country
West Kelowna
School districts in the Okanagan
23